Mentha laxiflora, the forest mint, is native to moist woodland in eastern Australia (Victoria, New South Wales and the Australian Capital Territory).

The flowering is present with 4–8 lobed flowers on short stalks that are mauve pink to white. It grows in damp soils in mountain forests and is used by Aborigines for medicines.

References

External links

laxiflora
Endemic flora of Australia
Plants described in 1848